Daniela Rocca (12 September 1937 – 28 May 1995) was an Italian actress, model and writer.

Biography
Rocca was born and raised in Acireale, a small town near Catania. She became Miss Catania in 1953, and was discovered by talent scouts after competing in a Miss Italy competition.

Rocca made her film debut in French director Maurice Cloche's Marchands de Filles (1957) and also appeared in the Riccardo Freda film Caltiki – The Immortal Monster (Caltiki – il mostro immortale, 1959), and Esther and the King (1960). More film roles followed, but Rocca did not garner international attention until Divorce, Italian Style (Divorzio all'Italiana, 1961). Rocca became a star after playing the part of the smothering wife Marcello Mastroianni is desperate to escape in Pietro Germi's international box-office hit. Rocca fell in love with Germi during filming and attempted suicide when he rejected her. After that, she was considered unstable and was not offered significant roles. A nervous breakdown led to a stay in a mental hospital.

After playing minor roles in movies and television, her show business career ended in 1967. She ended her days in a retirement home in Milo, near Catania.  There she wrote four books: Agente segreto con licenza di vivere; Avvocato offresi; Il condannato a morte; and Psicoanalisi, sogni, fantasie nascosti nella mente; and a collection of poems, Ara.

Partial filmography

 La Luciana (1954)
 Il nostro campione (1955)
 Il padrone sono me (1955) - Nunziata
 Addio sogni di gloria (1957)
 Marchands de filles (1957) - Bettina
 Head of a Tyrant (1959) - Naomi
 Non perdiamo la testa (1959) - Volante
 Caltiki – The Immortal Monster (1959) - Linda
 Legions of the Nile (1959) - Teyrè
 The Giant of Marathon (1959) - Karis
 Austerlitz (1960) - Caroline Bonaparte
 Colossus and the Amazon Queen (1960) - Melitta
 Esther and the King (1960) - Queen Vashti
 Revenge of the Barbarians (1960) - Galla Placidia, Onorius' Sister
 Rome 1585 (1961) - Princess Alba of Portoreale
 Divorce, Italian Style (1961) - Rosalia Cefalù
 Peccati d'estate (1962) - Teresa
 The Captive City (1962) - Doushka
 I Don Giovanni della Costa Azzurra (1962) - Assuntina Greco, aka Géneviève
 L'attico (1963) - Silvana D'Angelo
 Symphonie pour un massacre (1963) - Hélène Valoti
 The Empty Canvas (1963) - Rita
 Behold a Pale Horse (1964) - Rosana, Mistress of Vinolas
 The Sucker (1965) - (uncredited)
 Assicurasi vergine (1967) - Carmela - don Pippo's lover
 Un giorno, una vita (1970) - Olga (final film role)

References

External links
 

1937 births
1995 deaths
People from Acireale
Italian film actresses
Actors from Sicily
20th-century Italian actresses
Models from Sicily